Pedro de Villagómez Vivanco (October 8, 1589 – May 12, 1671) was a Roman Catholic prelate who served as Archbishop of Lima (1640–1671) and Bishop of Arequipa (1632–1640).

Biography
Pedro de Villagómez Vivanco was born in Castroverde del Campo, Spain. On January 6, 1632, Pope Urban VIII, appointed him Bishop of Arequipa. On September 25, 1633, he was consecrated bishop by Hernando de Arias y Ugarte, Archbishop of Lima with Feliciano de la Vega Padilla, Bishop of La Paz, and Melchor Maldonado y Saavedra, Bishop of Córdoba as co-consecrators. On July 16, 1640, Pope Urban VIII, appointed him Archbishop of Lima where he served until his death on May 12, 1671.

Episcopal succession
While bishop, he was the principal consecrator of:

References

External links and additional sources
 (for Chronology of Bishops) 
 (for Chronology of Bishops) 
 (for Chronology of Bishops) 
 (for Chronology of Bishops) 

1589 births
1671 deaths
Bishops appointed by Pope Urban VIII
University of Salamanca alumni
17th-century Roman Catholic bishops in Peru
Roman Catholic bishops of Arequipa
Roman Catholic archbishops of Lima